The 1979 Chatham Cup was the 52nd annual nationwide knockout football competition in New Zealand.

Early stages of the competition were run in three regions (northern, central, and southern), with the National League teams receiving a bye until the Fourth Roundof the competition. In all, 131 teams took part in the competition. Note: Different sources give different numberings for the rounds of the competition: some start round one with the beginning of the regional qualifications; others start numbering from the first national knock-out stage. The former numbering scheme is used in this article.

The 1979 final
The final was the second all-Auckland final clash, the first having been between the same teams (but with a different winner) in 1973. North Shore's Adrian Elrick and Keith Hobbs appeared in both finals (the latter as a substitute in the first match), as did Mount Wellington's Tony Sibley and Bill de Graaf. North Shore won the final for a then-record equalling fifth time. The final was the first of five in a row to feature Mount Wellington.

The final has been described as "the one that slipped away", as the expected venue, Newmarket Park, was made unavailable after a small landslide destroyed much of the playing area. McLennan Park in Papakura stepped in as a replacement. Mount Wellington would have gone into the match as clear favourites, but the sending off of play-maker Brian Turner in the previous match rendered him suspended from the final,l evening the two sides up considerably.

In the first half goals were traded, with the Mount's John Leijh opening the scoring only for Keith Hobbs to level the score for North Shore. Early in the second spell Mount Wellington's Stewart Carruthers was sent off, tipping the scales towards the North Shore side. The Mount were entrenched deep in their own half for much of the remainder of the match but Ian Ormond was brought down in the box and slotted the ball home from the resulting penalty to take the cup over the Waitematā.

Results

Third Round

* Won on penalties by Napier City Rovers (5-3) and Eden (5-4). † Halswell United and Wellington City disqualified

Fourth Round

Fifth Round

Quarter-finals

* Woolston won 4–2 on penalties

Semi-finals

Final

References

Rec.Sport.Soccer Statistics Foundation New Zealand 1979 page
UltimateNZSoccer website 1979 Chatham Cup page

Chatham Cup
Chatham Cup
Chatham Cup
Chat